Vert-le-Petit is a commune in the Essonne department in Île-de-France in northern France. General Auguste Jubé de La Perelle (1765–1824) was born in Vert-le-Petit.

Inhabitants of Vert-le-Petit are known as Vertois.

Geography
The Juine forms part of the commune's southern border, then flows into the Essonne, which forms the commune eastern border.

See also
Communes of the Essonne department

References

External links

Official website 
Mayors of Essonne Association 

Communes of Essonne